"Wherever Would I Be" is a song by American rock band Cheap Trick, released in 1990 as the second single from their eleventh studio album Busted. It was written by American songwriter Diane Warren and produced by Richie Zito. "Wherever Would I Be" peaked at number 50 on the US Billboard Hot 100.

Music video
A music video was filmed to promote the single. It achieved medium rotation on MTV and play on The Jukebox Network and Hit Video USA.

Critical reception
In a review of Busted, Cash Box described the song as a "strong power ballad". Reviewing the song for AllMusic, Doug Stone commented: "Cheap Trick sleepwalks through the motions on this Diane Warren treacle. Loopy axe murderer Rick Nielsen steps up for a decent guitar solo, but no rock band should put fans through something like this. On the back is "Busted," the title track to Trick's nadir. Cheap Trick is so much above the material on both sides here."

Track listing
7" Single
"Wherever Would I Be" - 4:06
"Busted" - 4:04

7" Single (Spanish promo)
"Wherever Would I Be" - 4:06
"Wherever Would I Be" - 4:06

CD Single (US promo)
"Wherever Would I Be" - 3:55

CD Single (Japanese promo)
"Wherever Would I Be" - 4:06
"Busted" - 4:04

Charts

Personnel
Cheap Trick
 Robin Zander - lead vocals, rhythm guitar
 Rick Nielsen - lead guitar, backing vocals
 Tom Petersson - bass, backing vocals
 Bun E. Carlos - drums, percussion

Additional personnel
 Richie Zito - producer
 Mike Shipley - mixing
 George Marino - mastering

Dusty Springfield and Daryl Hall version 

In 1995, British pop singer Dusty Springfield and American rock/soul singer Daryl Hall recorded a duet version of the track. Added to Springfield's album A Very Fine Love, the song was the second-to-last single from Springfield. Due to modest sales of the album, Springfield and Columbia Records decided not to renew her contract. Springfield's breast cancer recurred in late 1996, and Springfield died in 1999, making A Very Fine Love her final album.

The version was used in the 1995 movie "While You Were Sleeping", starring Sandra Bullock and Bill Pullman. The song was also released as a single in mid-1995, peaking at #44 in the UK for a total of three weeks.

The single was released within Europe only on CD single. The main European version of the CD single featured two tracks, the a-side duet and the 1990 Springfield hit "Reputation". The European Maxi CD single featured four tracks; the a-side, a remix of the a-side titled "Wherever Would I Be (Walter A. Mix)", a solo version of "Wherever Would I Be" with the vocal handled by Springfield alone and the 1990 hit "Reputation".

The UK Maxi CD single featured four tracks; the a-side, a track from her "A Very Fine Love" album titled "All I Have To Offer You Is Love", the 1990 hit "Reputation" and the solo version of "Wherever Would I Be". Another UK Maxi CD single featured another four tracks; the a-side, a remix of the 1990 album track "Daydreaming", titled "Daydreaming (Edited 12" Master)", the edited single mix of "Arrested by You" and the remix of the a-side titled "Wherever Would I Be (Walter A. Mix)". A UK promotional CD single was also released, featuring just the a-side alone.

For both versions of the single, the artwork consisted of two zoomed-in shots of Springfield, taken from the artwork for the album "A Very Fine Love".

A music video was created for the duet.

Track listing
CD Single (European Release)
"Wherever Would I Be" - 3:52
"Reputation" - 4:10

CD Maxi Single (European Release)
"Wherever Would I Be" - 3:53
"Wherever Would I Be (Walter A. Mix)" - 4:00
"Wherever Would I Be (Dusty Solo)" - 3:53
"Reputation" - 4:10

CD Maxi Single (UK Release #1)
"Wherever Would I Be" - 3:52
"All I Have to Offer You is Love" - 3:47
"Reputation" - 4:10
"Wherever Would I Be (Dusty Solo)" - 3:51

CD Maxi Single (UK Release #2)
"Wherever Would I Be" - 3:56
"Daydreaming (Edited 12" Master)" - 8:18
"Arrested by You (Single Version)" - 3:50
"Wherever Would I Be (Walter A. Mix)" - 4:00

CD Single (UK Promo Release)
"Wherever Would I Be" - 3:53

Critical reception 
In a review of A Very Fine Love, Bruce Eder of AllMusic commented, "Indeed, the performances and the songs here stack up favorably next to, say, Brand New Me, her early-'70s intersection with Philly soul. One song here, "Where Would I Be?," which features a duet with Daryl Hall, got a little play for being in the movie "While You Were Sleeping", but otherwise, sad to say, this album passed relatively unnoticed for most of the public."

Chart performance

Personnel
 Dusty Springfield - lead vocal
 Daryl Hall - lead vocal

Production
 Tom Shapiro - producer of "Wherever Would I Be" and "All I Have To Offer You Is Love", arranger on "Wherever Would I Be (Walter A. Mix)"
 Brian Tankersley - recording and mixing on "Wherever Would I Be" and "Wherever Would I Be (Walter A. Mix)"
 Walter Afanasieff - additional production and arrangement on "Wherever Would I Be (Walter A. Mix)"
 Jay Healy - recording on "Wherever Would I Be (Walter A. Mix)"
 Dana Jon Chappelle - recording and mixing on "Wherever Would I Be (Walter A. Mix)"
 Mick Guzauski - mixing on "Wherever Would I Be (Walter A. Mix)"
 Andy Richards - producer of "Reputation"
 Julian Mendelsohn, Pet Shop Boys - producers of "Daydreaming (Edited 12" Master)"
 Paul Staveley O'Duffy - producer of "Arrested by You"

Other
 John Geary - illustration
 Stylorouge - design

Other cover versions
In 1993, American rock singer Henry Lee Summer released a cover of the song on his album Slamdunk.
In 1997, a Diane Warren promotional six-disc set titled A Passion for Music featured four CDs of the hits of Diane Warren from 1983-1997 and two CDs of hidden classics in their original demo form. Amongst the demo versions was the original demo of "Wherever Would I Be", performed by Warren herself.

References

1990 singles
Cheap Trick songs
Dusty Springfield songs
Daryl Hall songs
Songs written by Diane Warren
Song recordings produced by Richie Zito
1990 songs
Epic Records singles
Columbia Records singles
Rock ballads
1990s ballads